The Wapet Road, also known as the Kidson Track, is an outback track in the Pilbara region of Western Australia. Since 2014, both the part of the road that is within the native title lands of the Nyangumarta people (Nyangumarta country) and the adjacent part between Nyangumarta country and Great Northern Highway are called Nyangumarta Highway.

The name of the road was derived from early tracks cut by the oil exploration company WAPET.

Despite it predominantly passing through desert, birdwatchers and others access the track notwithstanding its difficult traverse.

It passes through country known as the Western Desert cultural bloc and more specifically the Martu Determined Native Title Area. Parts of the Kidson track also pass through other native title areas including Nyungamarta, Kulyakartu and Ngurra.

There is a separation of the Kidson Track from the Wapet Road as separate parts of the same track on one source, however another does not make the distinction.

See also

References

Roads in Western Australia
Pilbara
Canning Stock Route